Colleferro (IPA: /kɔllefɛrro/) is a small town with 20 698 inhabitants of the Metropolitan City of Rome in the Lazio region of central Italy. It is a residential zone with many different industries and sports structures. It borders the City of Frosinone.

Physical geography

Territory 
Colleferro, not exactly in the province of Frosinone, but on its threshold in the province of Rome, is the site of one of the private industries of Central Italy, Bombrini and Parodi; it stands out in the agricultural and pastoral industries and it's one of the most hardworking of Lazio. "Incubation place" of anti-fascism before the war broke out, the center of partisan struggle later, and today of politically advanced ideas, Colleferro is a small modernist worker city, full of radio antennas. Regions like Lazio, modernizing themselves, not only attenuate old characteristics but also compete with "opposite ones". 

(Guido Piovene)

Colleferro is located near the Sacco (river) in the Valle del Sacco.

History

Appian and Plutarch describe a decisive battle in the Civil War against Gaius Marius the Younger, which took place in 82 BC at Colleferro,   concluded in favor of Sulla. At the end of the siege, Marius committed suicide.

At Colleferro Italian patriot Enrico Toti, on 27 March 1908, had his left leg crushed. The train was stopped at the station to be joined by the Colleferro train. Toti was lubricating the engine of the locomotive and, when the locomotive moved, he slipped causing his left leg to be trapped and crushed by the gears.

The development of the town began as early as 1912 with the conversion of a long-disused sugar factory (the Valsacco factory) to an explosive factory. Initially, the town developed away from where the center is today; the first few buildings (including the Church of St. Joachim) were built within the territory of the nearby town of Valmontone, near the train station that was then called "Segni-Paliano", and was renamed "Segni-Station Colleferro" after the birth of the town.

The engineer Leopoldo Parodi Delfino (former senator and son of the founder of the National Bank, then Bank of Italy) and Senator Giovanni Bombrini founded the 'Bombrini Parodi Delfino explosives factory. Nearby, a new "BPD Village" was created, and factory workers and their families from throughout Italy moved into them. Later, a cement factory opened (the "Lime & Cement Segni", subsequently acquired by Italcementi), using materials quarried from the nearby town of Segni.

Colleferro continued growing throughout the 1920s and 1930s with still within the municipality of Valmontone. In 1935 Colleferro was incorporated as a new city. Later, Colleferro incorporated portions of the neighboring municipalities of Segni and Paliano.

On 1 February 1938 there was the worst ever explosion at the Bombrini Parodi Delfino (BPD).  The number of dead and wounded and the damage was so severe that the news was reported even in the British Times. Within about three hours with of the explosion, the king, Victor Emmanuel III, Benito Mussolini, along with government and military officials, were in Colleferro to see what happened, visiting the wounded, and planning what to do for the wounded and the town.

During World War II, the Allies repeatedly bombarded Colleferro to destroy the explosives factory. During the attacks, citizens found shelter in a series of caves and tunnels built under the "BPD Village".

In the early 1950s, BPD manufactured Lauryl, the first soap powder in Italy.

On 9 October 2007 one person was killed and eight were injured in an explosion at a weapons factory belonging to Italian company Simmel Difesa.

Twinning 
Colleferro is twinned with:
 Colmenar Viejo, Spain

Main sights

Colleferro is home to the following churches:
 Santa Barbara
 Church of the Immaculate
 Church of San Bruno
 Church of St. Joachim
 Temple of Santa Barbara
 Church of St. Benedict
 Temple of Saint Anne

The air-raid shelters, residues of World War II, where some 1,500 civilians found shelter during the bombing, most of the "refuge" is still open on the feast of St. Barbara (4 December), patron of the country.

Economy

Agriculture 
The territory has always been an agricultural vocation.
From 2006 is in the "Rural District and the Valley of the agro-energy Latin.

As part of the redevelopment of the Valle del Sacco was initiated an experiment in "non-food crops (crops not for food). The crops will be sunflower for the biodiesel and poplars to power boilers biomass.

As for the 'livestock, the environmental crisis had forced the slaughter of livestock and destruction of health protection for milk in all farms in the area. The farm has since rebounded with numerous protections for consumers.

Industry 
The development of Colleferro is linked from the beginning to its industrial, with the opening of explosives Bombrini Parodi Delfino (BDP), to which were added numerous chemical plants and textile. The industrial area of Colleferro spread over 1000 hectares of land, mostly owned by Se.co.svim.

Some of the companies in the territory and have been: SNIA S.p.A. for working with pozzolan's Italcementi in the chemical Caffaro Ketones, Caffaro Benzoin the Se.co . Svim; for the construction and repair of the railway car body Alstom and RFI. Among the companies working with advanced teconology, Avio operates in the aerospace sector. Simmel business is in the war industry.

Sport 
Colleferro includes the following sport venues:

 Municipal Stadium Maurizio Natali
 Municipal Stadium Andrea Caslino
 Sports Hall Alfredo Romboli
 Municipal Swimming Pool
 Field Archery
 Bowls Hall

External links
 Official website

Cities and towns in Lazio